James Michael Pushor (born February 11, 1973)  is a Canadian former professional ice hockey player. He is currently Director of Player Personnel with the Tampa Bay Lightning of the National Hockey League (NHL).

Pushor was drafted 32nd overall in the second round of the 1991 NHL Entry Draft by the Detroit Red Wings. He played in the NHL for the Red Wings, Mighty Ducks of Anaheim, Dallas Stars, Columbus Blue Jackets, Pittsburgh Penguins and New York Rangers. He has won 3 Stanley Cup championships, in 1997 with the Red Wings as a player and in 2020, and 2021 with the Lightning as an executive.

As a free agent (previously playing for the Columbus Blue Jackets), Pushor was acquired by the Toronto Maple Leafs in 2003 on a try-out contract in the off-season. He failed to make the cut for the team on the try-out contract.

Pushor retired during the 2006–07 campaign, after abruptly leaving the Syracuse Crunch  mid-season.

Career statistics

Regular season and playoffs

Awards
1993 - WHL Humanitarian of the Year Award

External links

1973 births
Living people
Adirondack Red Wings players
Atlanta Thrashers
Canadian ice hockey defencemen
Columbus Blue Jackets players
Dallas Stars players
Detroit Red Wings draft picks
Detroit Red Wings players
Hartford Wolf Pack players
Ice hockey people from Alberta
Lethbridge Hurricanes players
Mighty Ducks of Anaheim players
New York Rangers players
Pittsburgh Penguins players
Sportspeople from Lethbridge
Stanley Cup champions
Syracuse Crunch players
Tampa Bay Lightning scouts